In the sport of cricket, a hat-trick is an occasion where a bowler takes three wickets in consecutive deliveries.  As of 2 January 2018, this feat has been achieved 76 times since 1934 in the Ranji Trophy, the domestic first-class cricket championship played in India. The first Ranji Trophy hat-trick was taken by Baqa Jilani. The most recent bowler to achieve the feat was Ravi Yadav. Joginder Rao is the only player to take three hat-tricks in the Ranji Trophy. After taking a hat-trick against Uttar Pradesh, Ravi Yadav became the first bowler to pick up a hat-trick in his first over on first-class debut.

Ranji hat-tricks

Hat-tricks by team

See also 
 Ranji Trophy
 List of Ranji Trophy records

References

Ranji Trophy
Ranji Trophy
Indian cricket lists
Ranji trophy